Two ships of the Royal Navy have been named HMS Cherub, after the cherub:
 was an 18-gun Royal Navy  sloop built in Dover in 1806 and sold in 1820.
 was a  wood screw gunboat launched in 1865 and sold in 1890 for breaking up.

References

Royal Navy ship names